Pusula Church is a wooden church located in the Pusula village in Lohja, Finland. The church was designed by Carl Ludvig Engel and it was built by master builder Henrik Andsten. The church was completed in 1838. After its completion, structural problems appeared in the church, as its walls could not withstand the weight of the roof, so the roof had to be lowered by 8 meters. The repair work was done in 1858-59.

The altarpiece of the church was painted by Felix Frang from Urjala in 1921.

The church's pipe organ was manufactured by the Kangasala organ factory in 1936. Most of the organ pipes were taken from the church's previous organs, which were manufactured by the Tallinn-based Normann organ factory.

References

External links

 Pusulan kirkko - Lohjan seurakunta (in Finnish)

Carl Ludvig Engel buildings
Wooden churches in Finland
Churches completed in 1838
Buildings and structures in Uusimaa
Lohja
19th-century churches in Finland
19th-century Lutheran churches